Pogge is a name for the fish Agonus cataphractus.

Pogge is also a German surname. Notable people with the surname include: 

Justin Pogge (born 1986), Canadian hockey player
Thomas Pogge (born 1953), German philosopher
Paul Pogge (1838-1884), German explorer of Africa
Brenda Pogge (born 1957), American politician